Caro may refer to:

Places 
 Caro, Michigan, United States
 Caro, Morbihan, France
 Çaro, Pyrénées-Atlantiques, France

Other uses 
 Caro (given name), including a list of people with the given name
 Caro (surname), including a list of people with the surname
 Caro (drink), a drink by Nestlé
 Caro (horse) (1967–1989), a French Thoroughbred racehorse
 "Caro" (Bad Bunny song), 2018
 "Caro" (L.A.X and Wizkid song), 2013
 CARO, Computer Antivirus Research Organization
 Caro Ru Lushe, a fictional character in Magical Girl Lyrical Nanoha StrikerS
 Caro, a Vietnamese variant of the game Gomoku
 Polonez Caro or FSO Polonez, a Polish automobile

See also 
 Frank–Caro process, used to produce cyanamide from calcium carbide and nitrogen gas in an electric furnace
 Linde–Frank–Caro process, another process used to produce hydrogen from water gas
 Peroxymonosulfuric acid, also known as Caro's acid
 Karo (disambiguation)